St. Louis Community College (STLCC) is a public community college in St. Louis, Missouri.  It is supported by the Junior College District of St. Louis City – St. Louis County, servicing 718 square miles.

History 
In 1966 STLCC built three campuses: Florissant Valley Community College in Ferguson, Forest Park Community College in St. Louis, and Meramec Community College in Kirkwood.

Over the objections of the faculty and student body, in 1976 STLCC administration changed the names of the individual campuses to the format St. Louis Community College–Campus Name.

In August 2007, STLCC opened a fourth campus, St. Louis Community College-Wildwood, in Wildwood.

In addition, there are four satellite facilities throughout the area.

Dissatisfaction with Chancellor Pittman 
Jeff Pittman became chancellor of STLCC in July 2015. Pittman is reported to have received approximately 40,000 dollars for housing and car allowance in 2016.  The Chancellor's level of compensation was characterized as 70 percent above the national average by some faculty concerned with the management of the college.  Student protests occurred under Pittman.

On November 28, 2017 the college's chapter of the NEA called for a vote of no confidence in Chancellor Pittman and the board of trustees. Included in the NEA's call for a vote of no confidence was the statement by its President Robert Hertel, that the union was responding to "the levels of waste and mismanagement taking place at the college for YEARS." In January 2018, the Executive Council of the college's chapter of the National Education Association had a unanimous vote of "No Confidence" in Chancellor Pittman.

Academics 
The college grants Associate's degrees (A.A., A.S., A.A.S., A.F.A.), as well as Certificates of Proficiency (for completing a specified one-year course of study) and Certificates of Specialization (for completing a specified six-month course of study).

Athletics 
STLCC operates as a single entity in athletic competition (as opposed to each campus operating as a separate program, which was the case prior to consolidation).  Athletic teams are open to any eligible STLCC student, regardless of which campus the student attends.

The teams are known as the Archers (named for, and the athletic teams' logo incorporates, the Gateway Arch) and participate in the Missouri Community College Athletic Conference (MCCAC).

The Florissant Valley Campus hosts Men's Soccer.
The Forest Park Campus hosts Men's and Women's Basketball.
The Meramec Campus hosts Men's Baseball, Women's Soccer, Women's Softball, and Women's Volleyball.

The Wildwood Campus does not host any STLCC athletic programs.

Noted alumni 
David Freese, professional baseball player
Dana Loesch, talk show host
T.J. Mathews, professional baseball player
Mike Miano, professional football player
Josh Outman, professional baseball player
Steve Pecher, professional soccer player
Joe Right, professional soccer player
Ronnie L. White, United States District Judge
Deron Winn, professional mixed martial artist

References

External links 
 

 
Educational institutions established in 1964
Community colleges in Missouri
Universities and colleges in St. Louis
1964 establishments in Missouri
NJCAA athletics